Roman Kłosowski (14 February 1929 – 11 June 2018) was a Polish character actor and stage director.

Biography
He was born on February 14, 1929, in Biała Podlaska. Graduate of the Aleksander Zelwerowicz National Academy of Dramatic Art's Faculty of Acting (1953) and Faculty of Directing (1965). He made his theater debut on September 1, 1953. Kłosowoski made his debut on stage as Puck in the production of Shakespeare's A Midsummer Night's Dream. He made his screen debut in 1953, starring in the film Celuloza  by Jerzy Kawalerowicz. He would go on the star in another of Kawalerowicz's films, Shadow (Cień) in 1956, a film which was entered into the 1956 Cannes Film Festival. The film is a Rashōmon-like investigation into the life of a man found dead after having been hurled from a train.

Then in 1964 he starred in the Aleksander Ford film The First Day of Freedom which was entered into the 1965 Cannes Film Festival. Kłosowski starred alongside Tadeusz Łomnicki, Beata Tyszkiewicz and Tadeusz Fijewski. In the late 1960s he appeared in the World War II miniseries Czterej pancerni i pies. In 1971, he appeared in the Polish superhero comedy film, Hydrozagadka, portraying the Maharaja of Kabur. The film was directed by Andrzej Kondratiuk. From 1974 to 1976, he starred in the successful television comedy series Czterdziestolatek. In the years 1976–1981, he was the general and artistic director of the Powszechny Theater in Łódź, as well as a lecturer at the Acting Department of the Łódź Film School. 

In 1986, he once again was directed by Andrzej Kondratiuk in the comedy-sci-fi television series Big Bang. Playing the character of Shepherd Kazimierz, he featured alongside actors such as Ludwik Benoit, Zofia Merle and Janusz Gajos. In 1989 he played the role of Edward in the Andrzej Barański's film, The Peddler. In 1996 he would again collaborate with Barański and appear in the psychological film, Dzień wielkiej ryby, in 1996.

Then in the 1990s he starred in the Polish sitcom series Świat według Kiepskich. In 2008 he portrayed Nostradamus in the comedy drama film, Before Twilight (Jeszcze nie wieczór).

Roman Kłosowski died on June 11, 2018, in Łódź. He was buried on June 18, 2018, at the Powązki Military Cemetery in Warsaw.

Selected filmography 

 Celuloza, by Jerzy Kawalerowicz (1953)
 Człowiek na torze, by A. Munk (1956)
 Cień, by Jerzy Kawalerowicz (1956)
 Eroica, by A. Munk (1957)
 Ewa chce spać, by T. Chmielewski (1958)
 Baza ludzi umarłych, by Cz. Petelski (1958)
 Pętla aka The Noose, by Wojciech Has (1958)
 Giuseppe w Warszawie, by S. Lenartowicz (1964)
 Pierwszy dzień wolności, by Aleksander Ford (1964)
 Three Steps on Earth (1965)
 Hydrozagadka – by Andrzej Kondratiuk
 Czterej pancerni i pies
 Czterdziestolatek, by J. Gruza, TV series (1974–1976)
 Czy jest tu panna na wydaniu, by Janusz Kondratiuk (1976)
 Wielka majówka, by K. Rogulski (1981)
 Big Bang, by Andrzej Kondratiuk (1986)
 Sonata marymoncka, by J. Ridan (1987)
 Koniec sezonu na lody, by S. Szyszko (1987)
 I Love, You Love (1989)
 Kramarz, reż. A. Barański (1990)
 Dzień wielkiej ryby, by A. Barański (1996)
 Świat według Kiepskich, by O.Khamidow
 Rób swoje ryzyko jest twoje, by M. Terlecki (2002)
 Stacyjka, TV series (2003-2004)
 Atrakcyjny pozna panią (2004)
 Niania (2005–2006) as uncle Henio
 Jeszcze nie wieczór, by Jacek Bławut (2008)
 Ojciec Mateusz (2009)

Bibliography 
 Witold Filler, Lech Piotrowski, Poczet aktorów polskich. Od Solskiego do Lindy, wyd. Philip Wilson, Warszawa 1998.

References

External links

Film Polski biography

1929 births
2018 deaths
Polish male stage actors
Polish film actors
Polish male film actors
Actors from Łódź
People from Biała Podlaska
Knights of the Order of Polonia Restituta
Commanders of the Order of Polonia Restituta
Recipients of the Silver Medal for Merit to Culture – Gloria Artis
Aleksander Zelwerowicz National Academy of Dramatic Art in Warsaw alumni
Burials at Powązki Military Cemetery